Ramon Strauch i Vidal, O.F.M. (7 October 1760 – 16 April 1823), was a Roman Catholic Spanish bishop who served as the Bishop of Vic. He was killed in 1823 and his cause of canonization has commenced. The process started on 25 July 1933, and bestowed upon him the title of Servant of God.

Biography
Ramon Strauch i Vidal was born to a Swiss soldier who served in Spain. He felt his religious vocation at the age of sixteen and entered a Franciscan convent. Vidal was made a professor in Mallorca in 1789 and remained there into the Peninsular War. He was an open liberal and was critical of the Cortes of Cádiz and his work. He was imprisoned because of this.

Pope Pius VII appointed Vidal as the Bishop of Vic in 1816 and he received episcopal consecration in 1817. Conflict in Vic in 1821 forced him to leave for a brief period of time in Sant Boi de Lluçanès. Vidal was shot dead in 1823 and his corpse left on the road. It was not collected from the road for two days. In his diocese, he was hailed as a martyr of the Christian faith.

Cause of beatification
He was hailed as a martyr and there were calls for the commencement of his cause of canonization. That commenced under Pope Pius XI on 25 July 1933, thereby proclaiming him to be a Servant of God.

References

External links
Hagiography Circle
Catholic Hierarchy

1760 births
1823 deaths
19th-century Roman Catholic bishops in Spain
19th-century venerated Christians
19th-century Christian martyrs
Bishops of Vic
Spanish Franciscans
Spanish Servants of God
Martyred Roman Catholic bishops
Spanish murder victims
People murdered in Spain
Deaths by firearm in Spain